Barbara J. Owen (born January 25, 1933) is an American organist and organ scholar.

Born in Utica, New York, Owen attended Westminster Choir College, studying organ and receiving a bachelor's degree in music in 1955; from Boston University in 1962 she received her master's degree, in musicology. Among her instructors were Edward Broadhead, Alexander McCurdy, and George Faxon. In 1975 and 1977 she took summer classes at the North German Organ Academy; in 1985 she attended a similar course at the Academy of Italian Organ Music. In 1982 she received the Choir Master certificate from the American Guild of Organists. Owen began her performing career at a variety of churches in Connecticut and Massachusetts soon after graduating from Westminster; in 1963 she took a position in Newburyport, Massachusetts, becoming Music Director of the First Religious Society Unitarian Church. There she remained until retirement in 2002, in which year she took up an appointment at St. Anne's Episcopal Church in Lowell, Massachusetts, remaining there until 2007. Concurrently with these posts, in 1985 she became librarian of the Organ Library of the American Guild of Organists at Boston University. She has held numerous other positions for the Guild as well, serving as dean and councilor for several of its regions as well as councilor and president of the Organ Historical Society; she was named an advisory member of the board of the Instituto de Organos Historicos de Oaxaca in 2005, and in 1990 became a trustee of Methuen Memorial Music Hall. Owen retired from her librarianship in 2012, receiving the title of "Librarian Emerita" for her service.

For much of her career Owen has focused her efforts on the study and promotion of American music, having been encouraged in her early efforts by E. Power Biggs. Her scholarship in the field of organ music has led her to receive numerous prizes, sch as a fellowship from the National Endowment for the Humanities (1974-75); the Westminster Choir College Alumni Citation of Merit (1988); the Organ Historical Society Distinguished Service Award (1988); the American Musical Instrument Society Curt Sachs Award (1994);  and the AGO Organ Library Max Miller Book Award (2009); in 2014 her leadership in the American Guild of Organists garnered her that organization's Edward A. Hansen Leadership Award. In 2005 the Organ Historical Society published a festschrift in her honor, Literae Organi: Essays in Honor of Barbara Owen.

A collection of nineteenth-century hymnals donated by Owen is owned by the School of Theology Library at Boston University. Owen herself has versified or written a number of hymn texts as well.

References

1933 births
Living people
American classical organists
20th-century organists
20th-century American musicians
20th-century American women musicians
21st-century organists
21st-century American musicians
21st-century American women musicians
Women organists
American women librarians
Music librarians
American librarians
Musicians from Utica, New York
Classical musicians from New York (state)
Westminster Choir College alumni
Boston University alumni